Embu-Guaçu is a municipality in the state of São Paulo in Brazil. It is part of the Metropolitan Region of São Paulo. The population is 69,901 (2020 est.) in an area of 155.64 km². The elevation is 408 m.

References

External link

Municipalities in São Paulo (state)